Mingoose is a hamlet near St Agnes and north of Mount Hawke in Cornwall, England.

References

Hamlets in Cornwall